3953 Perth, provisional designation , is a stony Florian asteroid from the inner regions of the asteroid belt, approximately  in diameter. It was discovered on 6 November 1986, by American astronomer Edward Bowell at the Anderson Mesa Station near Flagstaff, Arizona. The asteroid was named for the Australian Perth Observatory.

Orbit and classification 

Perth is a member of the Flora family, a giant asteroid family and the largest family of stony asteroids in the main-belt. It orbits the Sun in the inner main-belt at a distance of 1.8–2.7 AU once every 3 years and 5 months (1,242 days). Its orbit has an eccentricity of 0.19 and an inclination of 5° with respect to the ecliptic.

Physical characteristics 

Perth is an assumed S-type asteroid, which corresponds with the overall spectral type of the Flora family.

Rotation period 

In February 2008, a rotational lightcurve of Perth was obtained by a collaboration of astronomers in a photometric survey of the Flora region. Lightcurve analysis gave a rotation period of 5.083 hours with a brightness variation of 0.28 magnitude. Other photometric observations at the Palomar Transient Factory in October 2010, and by Wiesław Wiśniewski in December 1993, gave a period of 5.087 and 5.2 hours with an amplitude of 0.92 and 1.09, respectively.

Diameter and albedo 

According to the survey carried out by the NEOWISE mission of NASA's Wide-field Infrared Survey Explorer, Perth measures 4.80 kilometers in diameter and its surface has an albedo of 0.335, while the Collaborative Asteroid Lightcurve Link assumes an albedo of 0.24 – taken from 8 Flora the Flora family's largest member and namesake – and derives a diameter of 4.18 kilometers based on an absolute magnitude of 14.06.

Naming 

This minor planet was named after the Australian Perth Observatory for its many contributions to astronomy including the Perth 70 meridian catalogue, the co-discovery of the rings of Uranus, and observational work on Comet Halley both in 1910 and 1986. The observatory was founded near the city of Perth in 1896, and moved to Bickley in 1965. The observatory is known for its astrometry and photometry on small Solar System bodies. The official naming citation was published by the Minor Planet Center on 17 August 1989.

References

External links 
 Asteroid Lightcurve Database (LCDB), query form (info )
 Dictionary of Minor Planet Names, Google books
 Asteroids and comets rotation curves, CdR – Observatoire de Genève, Raoul Behrend
 Discovery Circumstances: Numbered Minor Planets (1)-(5000) – Minor Planet Center
 
 

003953
Discoveries by Edward L. G. Bowell
Named minor planets
19861106